HD 3322 is a binary star system in the northern constellation of Andromeda. With an apparent visual magnitude of 6.51, it lies below the nominal brightness limit for visibility with the normal naked eye, but it is still possible to see the star with excellent vision under ideal seeing conditions. An annual parallax shift of  provides a distance estimate of roughly 700 light years.

This is a single-lined spectroscopic binary star system with an orbital period of around 400 days and an eccentricity of 0.57. Catalano and Leone (1991) found it to be a α2 CVn variable with a period of 4.6904 days, and thus it received the variable star designation PY And. It has an estimated 3.7 times the mass of the Sun and about 4.8 times the Sun's radius. It is radiating around 246 times the Sun's luminosity from its photosphere at an effective temperature of 12,882 K.

References

B-type giants
Alpha2 Canum Venaticorum variables
Spectroscopic binaries
Andromeda (constellation)
Durchmusterung objects
003322
002865
0149
Andromedae, PY